USS Cyclone (PC-1) was the first of the Navy's  coastal patrol ships. As the lead ship of her class, Cyclone served as the test bed for this series of 14 vessels.

Construction
Cyclone was laid down at Bollinger Shipyards, in Lockport, Louisiana, on 22 June 1991; and sponsored by Ms. Betty LeMoyne, wife of Deputy Commander-in-Chief and Chief of Staff, U.S. Special Operations Command, Rear Admiral Irve C. LeMoyne.

Originally scheduled to be commissioned on 1 May 1993, Cyclone incurred damage in collision with the steamship Robert E. Lee on 12 March, that required a ten-week yard period and delayed the ship's commissioning into the summer. Consequently, Cyclone was commissioned at the U.S. Naval Academy in Annapolis, Maryland, on 7 August 1993, Lieutenant Commander Randall L. Johnson in command.

History 

The primary mission of Cyclone was to serve as a platform for maritime special operations, including interdiction, escort, non-combatant evacuation, reconnaissance, operational deception, intelligence collection, and tactical swimmer operations. Her small size, stealthy construction, and high speed were tailored to performing long-range Special Operations Forces (SOF) insertion and extraction and other SOF support duties.

The ship's operational capabilities were designed to meet the unique requirements of its Special Warfare missions. In high-speed, hard-over turns, the ship barely heeled as the automatic stabilizers engaged.

Cyclone was originally armed with two Mk38 25 mm chain guns fore and aft, several pintle mounts for attaching .50 caliber machine guns or Mk 19 grenade launchers, and a position for launching Stinger shoulder-fired SAMs. She and others of her class were upgraded by replacing the after Mk38 mount with the new Mk96 platform which combines a 25 mm chain gun and a 40 mm grenade launcher on a single stabilized platform.

Decommissioning and transfer

Cyclone had barely gone into service in the mid-1990s when the Special Operations Command rejected them as too big for commando missions, and the regular surface Navy dismissed them as too small for any of its missions. The Navy began looking for ways to phase out Cyclone and her sister ships, so on 28 February 2000, Cyclone was decommissioned and stricken from the Navy list.

She was then transferred to the United States Coast Guard the next day, being re-commissioned as the USCGC Cyclone (WPC 1). The Coast Guard lacked an effective vessel sized between its 110' patrol cutter and the 210' Medium Endurance Cutter, so there was considerable interest in Cyclone at first. However, her high operating costs were prohibitive and thus she sat largely inactive.

Transferred
Cyclone was eventually sold under the Foreign Military Sales Program to the Philippine Navy on 8 March 2004, as part of a US military aid package to the Philippines, in an effort to bolster interdiction and counterterrorism capabilities. She was rechristened BRP Mariano Alvarez (PS-38), in honor of a revolutionary general in the Philippine war of independence against Spain.

References

Bibliography

External links

FAS
Globalsecurity
ww2pcsa.org
Navsource.org
military.com

 

Cyclone-class patrol ships
Ships transferred from the United States Navy to the Philippine Navy
Ships built in Lockport, Louisiana
1992 ships